Martín Andrés Cárcamo Papic (born April 21, 1975) is a Chilean television presenter, actor and former host of Pasiones and El Último Pasajero.

He debuted in television on the Chilean TV channel Rock & Pop where he was the host of Media Naranja and Noches de Verano. Later in 2004, he joined TVN as the host of Pasiones, replacing Felipe Camiroaga. In 2008, Cárcamo replaced Rafael Araneda in Rojo, Fama Contrafama. In 2009, he was a judge of the Festival de Viña del Mar, and until recently, he hosted Calle 7.

In October 2010, it was announced that Cárcamo left TVN to join rival channel Canal 13, where he started working in January 2011.

As a theatre actor, Cárcamo was part of Ellas Quieren y Él No Puede.

Television shows

Canal 2 Rock & Pop 
Media Naranja
Noches de Verano

Chilevisión 
Extra Jóvenes
Ya Siento que Vienen por mí
Amor a Ciegas
El Último Apaga la Luz
Panoramix
Primer Plano

Televisión Nacional de Chile 
Pasiones
Corre Video
Cada Loco con su Tema
El Último Pasajero
Rojo, el valor del talento
Calle 7

Canal 13 (Chile) 
 Bienvenidos
 Quiero Mi Fiesta
 Vértigo
 Bailando por un sueño
 De Tú a Tú
 ¡Qué Dice Chile!

References

External links
 

1975 births
Chilean male television actors
Chilean television presenters
Chilean people of Croatian descent
Chilean people of Basque descent
Living people
People from Viña del Mar
Chilean male stage actors
Chilean television personalities